Scea subcyanea is a moth of the family Notodontidae. It is found in Peru.

Taxonomic history
Louis Beethoven Prout initially described this taxon in 1918 as the subspecies Scea caesiopicta subcyanea; S. caesiopicta is now considered a junior synonym of Scea gigantea.
The type locality was given as "Carabaya, S.E. Peru, Oconeque to Aqualani, 6,000–9,000 ft".

James S. Miller elevated S. subcyanea to species level in 2009.

References

External links

 

Notodontidae of South America
Moths of South America
Taxa named by Louis Beethoven Prout
Moths described in 1918